Out of the Night is the first release by American hard rock band Great White in 1983. It was independently released and sold more than 8,000 copies in less than three months, with the band supporting Dokken in their 1983 US tour. This led to EMI picking up the band for their first full-length, self-titled LP. It was reissued as On Your Knees by Enigma Records in 1987, likely to capitalize on the band's growing popularity due to the album Once Bitten....

The songs also appeared on the US CD release of the live album Recovery: Live! and 3 of them ("Out of the Night", "On Your Knees" and "Dead End") appeared in the re-recorded versions on the debut LP.

Track listing 
All songs by Jack Russell and Mark Kendall, except "Dead End" by Russell, Kendall, and Gary Holland
"Out of the Night" – 2:14
"On Your Knees" – 4:19
"Last Time" – 3:42
"No Way" – 2:57
"Dead End" – 3:21

Personnel

Great White 
Jack Russell – lead vocals
Mark Kendall – guitar, backing vocals
Lorne Black – bass
Gary Holland – drums, backing vocals

Additional musicians 
Don Dokken, Michael Wagener, Alan Niven – backing vocals on "On Your Knees"
Mary Ulanskas – additional vocals on "On Your Knees"

Production 
Michael Wagener – producer, engineer, mixing at Larrabee Sound Studios
Don Dokken – producer
Alan Niven – producer on "No Way", executive producer, management
Sabrina Buchanek – mixing assistant
Jack Hunt – mastering

References 

Great White EPs
1983 debut EPs
Albums produced by Michael Wagener